Brigstocke may refer to:

 Charles Brigstocke (1876–1951), British civil servant
 Dominic Brigstocke, British television director
 George Brigstocke (d. 1971), British former Anglican priest and Roman Catholic convert
 Heather Brigstocke, Baroness Brigstocke (1929–2004), British schoolteacher, academic and peer
 John Brigstocke (1945–2020), British admiral
 Marcus Brigstocke (born 1973), English comedian
 Thomas Brigstocke (1809–1881), Welsh portrait painter

See also
Brigstock, a village in Northamptonshire in England